Lincoln County Hospital is a large district general hospital on the eastern edge of north-east Lincoln, England. It is the largest hospital in Lincolnshire, and offers the most comprehensive services, in Lincolnshire. It is managed by the United Lincolnshire Hospitals NHS Trust.

History

The hospital has its origins in some rented accommodation in St Swithin's which opened in November 1769. A purpose-built facility was designed by John Carr and William Lumby and built in Drury Lane between 1776 and 1777.

A new site was identified on Sewell Road and purchased in 1875. A new building, designed by Alexander Graham, was built on the new site and completed in 1878. The hospital joined the National Health Service in 1948.

The Lincoln Hospitals' Radio Service, which first broadcast from St George's Hospital in December 1979, moved to Lincoln County Hospital in 1988. Its founder, Ray Drury, had been a cartoonist with the Daily Express.

In 2013 a review by Professor Sir Bruce Keogh found that there was a significant backlog of complaints and that there had been a noticeable increase in the ombudsman having to intervene to investigate complaints that had not been followed up. Accordingly Keogh found that the complaints handling system was not fit for purpose. The trust implemented a new complaints system in response.

Notable staff 

 Cassandra Maria Beachcroft (1839-1937), Matron (1884-1898). Beachcroft trained as a Lady Probationer at The London Hospital under Annie Swift and Eva Luckes between about 1879-1881. She worked as a ward sister at both The London and St Bartholomew's Hospital before her appointment. She resigned as matron of Lincoln County Hospital after 14 years tenure because of a disagreement with the house surgeon over her professional autonomy. She was an early member of the British Nurse's Association and also a vice Chairman of the Matron's Council.

Services
The University of Nottingham Medical School has approximately 330 nursing students and 30 midwifery students at its Lincoln Education Centre. Lincolnshire and Nottinghamshire share the Lincolnshire & Nottinghamshire Air Ambulance.

See also
 Pilgrim Hospital

References

External links
 NHS Choices
 Hospital site map

Hospitals established in the 1770s
Hospitals in Lincolnshire
Hospital buildings completed in 1878
Buildings and structures in Lincoln, England
1776 establishments in Great Britain
NHS hospitals in England